Southern Europe is the southern region of Europe. It is also known as Mediterranean Europe, as its geography is marked by the Mediterranean Sea. Definitions of Southern Europe include some or all of these countries and regions: Albania, Andorra, Bosnia and Herzegovina, Bulgaria, Croatia, Cyprus, Turkey (East Thrace), Gibraltar, Greece, Italy, Kosovo, Malta, Moldova, Monaco, Montenegro, North Macedonia, Portugal, Romania, San Marino, Serbia, Slovenia, Southern France, Spain, and Vatican City (the Holy See).

Southern Europe is focused on the three peninsulas located in the extreme south of the European continent. These are the Iberian Peninsula, the Apennine Peninsula, and the Balkan Peninsula. These three peninsulas are separated from the rest of Europe by towering mountain ranges, respectively by the Pyrenees, the Alps and the Balkan Mountains. The location of these peninsulas in the heart of the Mediterranean Sea, as well as their mountainous reliefs, provide them with very different types of climates (mainly subtropical Mediterranean) from the rest of the continent. So, the Sirocco hot wind that originates in the heart of the Sahara blows over Italy, going up to the interior of the Alpine arc (Po Valley). The Alps prevent the Sirocco from spreading to the rest of Europe. And, conversely, the Alps and the Pyrenees protect the Italian and Iberian peninsulas from the rains and icy winds from the south of France such as the Mistral and the Tramontane. When the Mistral and the Tramontane are blowing, this provokes an "upwelling" phenomenon on the French coast. They push the surface waters out to sea and bring deeper, cooler waters up to the seaside. Consequently, the temperature of the waters of the French coasts are therefore very cool even in summer, and not representative of the rest of the Mediterranean.
This same kind of phenomenon takes place between the two slopes of the Balkan Mountain Range. These mountains have, moreover, been a serious handicap to population displacement, focusing southern Europe mainly on the Mediterranean world. The climate and cultures are therefore very specific.

Different methods can be used to define Southern Europe, including its political, economic, historical, and cultural attributes. Southern Europe can also be defined by its natural features — its geography, climate, and flora. Politically, nine of the Southern European countries form the EU Med Group. Southern Europe also loosely corresponds to the European part of the Mediterranean Basin.

Geography 

Geographically, Southern Europe is the southern portion of the European continent. This definition is relative, although largely based on history, culture, climate, and flora, which is shared across the region. Southern Europe can be subdivided into three subregions:

 South-western Europe
 Balearic Islands (Spain)
 Iberian Peninsula
 Andorra
 French Cerdagne (France)
 Gibraltar (United Kingdom)
 Portugal (mainland)
 Spain (mainland)
 Pyrénées-Orientales (France)

 South-central Europe
 Alpes-Maritimes (France)
 Apennine Peninsula
 Central Italy
 San Marino
 South Italy
 Vatican City (Holy See)
 Corsica (France)
 Insular Italy
 Sardinia
 Sicily
 Istria (peninsula)
 Ankaran (Slovenia)
 Istria County (Croatia)
 Izola (Slovenia)
 Koper (Slovenia)
 Muggia (Italy)
 Piran (Slovenia)
 San Dorligo della Valle (Italy)
 Malta
 Monaco
 Northern Italy
 Northeast Italy
 Northwest Italy
 Ticino (Switzerland)

 Southeast Europe
 Balkan Peninsula
 Albania
 Bosnia and Herzegovina
 Bulgaria
 Croatia (southern mainland)
 East Thrace (Turkey)
 Gorizia (Italy)
 Greece (mainland)
 Kosovo
 Montenegro
 North Macedonia
 Romania (Northern Dobruja)
 Serbia (Central Serbia)
 Slovenia (south-western part)
 Trieste (Italy)
 Croatia (northern mainland & offshore islands)
 Cyprus
 Greece (islands)
 Moldova
 Romania (inland part)
 Slovenia (north-eastern part)
 Serbia (Vojvodina)

The major islands in Southern Europe generally include the Balearic Islands, Corsica, Crete, Cyprus, Sardinia, and Sicily, as well as the island country of Malta.

Gallery

Climate

Southern Europe's most emblematic climate is the Mediterranean climate, influenced by the large subtropical semi-permanent centre of high atmospheric pressure found, not in the Mediterranean itself, but in the Atlantic Ocean, the Azores High. The Mediterranean climate covers Portugal, Spain, Italy, the southern coast of France, coastal Croatia, coastal Slovenia, southern Bosnia and Herzegovina, Montenegro, Albania, and Greece, as well as the Mediterranean islands. Those areas of Mediterranean climate present similar vegetations and landscapes throughout, including dry hills, small plains, pine forests and olive trees.

Cooler climates can be found in certain parts of Southern European countries, for example within the mountain ranges of Spain and Italy. Additionally, the north coast of Spain experiences a wetter Atlantic climate. In the highest regions of the Alps, which border Southern Europe, even ice cap climate can be found.

Some parts of Southern Europe have humid subtropical climates with warm and wet summers, unlike typical Mediterranean climates. This climate is mainly found in Italy and Croatia around the Adriatic Sea in cities such as Venice and Trieste, but also further north, near the Alpine foothills, in cities such as Como and Lugano.

Flora 

Southern Europe's flora is mainly characterized by Mediterranean forests, woodlands, and scrub, but also temperate broadleaf and mixed forests. The Mediterranean and Submediterranean climate regions in Europe are found in much of Southern Europe, mainly Portugal, Spain, Italy, Malta, Albania, Greece, Cyprus and all the mediterranean islands, but also in southeast France, the Balkan Mediterranean coast and part of Macedonia.

In the Mediterranean coastal areas, olive groves, maquis shrubland, and steppes are very common. At higher elevations, or latitudes, they are replaced by chestnut and (often coppiced) mixed forests.

History

Early history

The Phoenicians originally expanded from Canaan ports, dominating trade in the Mediterranean by the 8th century BC. Carthage was founded in 814 BC, and the Carthaginians by 700 BC had firmly established strongholds in Sicily and Sardinia (both regions in present day Italy), which created conflicts of interest with Etruria. Its colonies later reached the Western Mediterranean, such as Cádiz in Spain and most notably Carthage in North Africa, and even the Atlantic Ocean. The civilisation spread across the Mediterranean between 1500 BC and 300 BC.

The period known as classical antiquity began with the rise of the city-states of Ancient Greece. Greek influence reached its zenith under the expansive empire of Alexander the Great, spreading throughout Asia. The Roman Empire came to dominate the entire Mediterranean Basin in a vast empire based on Roman law and Roman legions. It promoted trade, tolerance, and Greek culture. By 300 AD the Roman Empire was divided into the Western Roman Empire based in Rome, and the Eastern Roman Empire based in Constantinople. The attacks of the Goths led to the fall of the Western Roman Empire in 476 AD, a date which traditionally marks the end of the classical period and the start of the Middle Ages. During the Middle Ages, the Eastern Roman Empire survived, though modern historians refer to this state as the Byzantine Empire. In Western Europe, Germanic peoples moved into positions of power in the remnants of the former Western Roman Empire and established kingdoms and empires of their own.

The period known as the Crusades, a series of religiously motivated military expeditions originally intended to bring the Levant back into Christian rule, began. Several Crusader states were founded in the eastern Mediterranean. These were all short-lived. The Crusaders would have a profound impact on many parts of Europe. Their sack of Constantinople in 1204 brought an abrupt end to the Byzantine Empire. Though it would later be re-established, it would never recover its former glory. The Crusaders would establish trade routes that would develop into the Silk Road and open the way for the merchant republics of Genoa and Venice to become major economic powers. The Reconquista, a related movement, worked to reconquer Iberia for Christendom. The late Middle Ages represented a period of upheaval in Europe. The epidemic known as the Black Death and an associated famine caused demographic catastrophe in Europe as the population plummeted. Dynastic struggles and wars of conquest kept many of the states of Europe at war for much of the period. In the Balkans, the Ottoman Empire, a Turkish state originating in Anatolia, encroached steadily on former Byzantine lands, culminating in the fall of Constantinople in 1453.

Post-Middle Ages

Beginning roughly in the 12th century in Florence, and later spreading through Europe with the development of the printing press, a Renaissance of knowledge challenged traditional doctrines in science and theology, with the Arabic texts and thought bringing about rediscovery of classical Greek and Roman knowledge. The Catholic reconquest of Portugal and Spain led to a series of oceanic explorations resulting in the Age of Discovery that established direct links with Africa, the Americas, and Asia. During this period, Iberian forces engaged in a worldwide struggle with Islamic societies; the battlefronts in this Ibero-Islamic World War stretched from the Mediterranean into the Indian Ocean, finally involving the islands of Southeast Asia. Eventually this ecumenical conflict ended when new players—England, Holland and France—replaced Spain and Portugal as the main agents of European imperialism in the mid-17th century.

European overseas expansion led to the rise of colonial empires, producing the Columbian Exchange. The combination of resource inflows from the New World and the Industrial Revolution of Great Britain, allowed a new economy based on manufacturing instead of subsistence agriculture. The period between 1815 and 1871 saw a large number of revolutionary attempts and independence wars. Balkan nations began to regain independence from the Ottoman Empire. Italy unified into a nation state. The capture of Rome in 1870 ended the Papal temporal power.

20th and 21st century
The outbreak of World War I in 1914 was precipitated by the rise of nationalism in Southeastern Europe as the Great Powers took up sides. The Allies defeated the Central Powers in 1918. During the Paris Peace Conference the Big Four imposed their terms in a series of treaties, especially the Treaty of Versailles. The Nazi regime under Adolf Hitler came to power in 1933, and along with Mussolini's Italy sought to gain control of the continent by the Second World War.
Following the Allied victory in the Second World War, Europe was divided by the Iron Curtain. The countries in Eastern and Southeastern Europe were dominated by the Soviet Union and became communist states. The major non-communist Southern European countries joined a US-led military alliance (NATO) and formed the European Economic Community amongst themselves. The countries in the Soviet sphere of influence joined the military alliance known as the Warsaw Pact and the economic bloc called Comecon. Yugoslavia was neutral. The common attribute of the eastern countries is that all of them have experiences with socialism, but nevertheless, the beginning of the 1990s was just roughly the same. For some of them becoming independent was the major challenge, while others needed to face with poverty and deep dictatorship also Economically, parallel with the political changes, and the democratic transition, – as a rule of law states – the previous command economies were transformed via the legislation into market economies, and set up or renewed the major macroeconomic factors: budgetary rules, national audit, national currency, central bank. Generally, they shortly encountered the following problems: high inflation, high unemployment, low economic growth and high government debt. By 2000 these economies were stabilized, and sooner or later between 2004 and 2013 some of them joined the European Union, and Slovenia introduced the euro.

Italy became a major industrialized country again, due to its post-war economic miracle. The European Union (EU) involved the division of powers, with tax, health, and education handled by the nation states, while the EU had charge of market rules, competition, legal standards and environmentalism. The Soviet economic and political system collapsed, leading to the end of communism in the satellite countries in 1989, and the dissolution of the Soviet Union itself in 1991. European Union expanded to subsequently include many of the formerly communist European countries – Romania and Bulgaria (2007) and Croatia (2013).

The Gotthard, a major and direct transport axis between Northern and Southern Europe, was completed in 2016 with the Gotthard Base Tunnel. The Gotthard inscribes itself in a long history of transit across the Alps, which saw them progressively changing from an obstacle to a corridor between the North Sea and the Mediterranean Sea.

Demographics

Languages

Romance languages 
The most widely spoken family of languages in Southern Europe are the Romance languages, the heirs of Latin, which have spread from the Italian peninsula, and are emblematic of Southwestern Europe. (See the Latin Arch.) By far the most common Romance languages in Southern Europe are Italian (spoken by over 50 million people in Italy, southern Switzerland, Malta, San Marino, and Vatican City) and Spanish, which is spoken by over 40 million people in Spain, Andorra and Gibraltar. Other common Romance languages include Portuguese (spoken in Portugal and Andorra), French (spoken in France, Monaco, and the Aosta Valley in Italy), Catalan (spoken in eastern Spain, Andorra, Southwestern France, and the Sardinian town of Alghero in Italy), Galician (spoken in northwestern Spain), Mirandese (spoken in northeast Portugal), and Occitan, which is spoken in the Val d'Aran in Catalonia, in the Occitan Valleys in Italy and in southern France.

Other languages 
The Hellenic languages or Greek language are widely spoken in Greece and Cyprus. Additionally, other varieties of Greek are spoken in small communities in parts of other European countries.

English is used as a second language in parts of Southern Europe. As a primary language, however, English has only a small presence in Southern Europe, only in Gibraltar (alongside Spanish) and Malta (secondary to Maltese). English is also widely spoken in Cyprus.

There are other language groupings in Southern Europe. Albanian is spoken in Albania, Kosovo, North Macedonia, Montenegro, Greece, Serbia, Croatia and Italy (particularly by the Arbëreshë people in Southern Italy), and Serbo-Croatian is spoken in Kosovo, Croatia, Serbia, Bosnia, Montenegro, North Macedonia and Italy (in Molise). Slovenian is spoken in Slovenia, Italy (in Friuli-Venezia Giulia) and Croatia (in Istria) and Macedonian is spoken in North Macedonia. Maltese is a Semitic language that is the official language of Malta, descended from Siculo-Arabic, but written in the Latin script with heavy Latin and Italian influences. The Basque language is spoken in the Basque Country, a region in northern Spain and southwestern France. Turkish is a Turkic language that is spoken in Turkey, Cyprus, Kosovo, Greece, North Macedonia and Bosnia, and German is spoken in Italy, particularly in South Tyrol.

Religion 
The predominant religion in Southern Europe is Christianity. Christianity spread throughout Southern Europe during the Roman Empire, and Christianity was adopted as the official religion of the Roman Empire in the year 380 AD. 
Due to the historical break of the Church into the western half based in Rome and the eastern half based in Constantinople, different denominations of Christianity are prominent in different parts of Europe.
Christians in the western half of Southern Europe — e.g., Portugal, Spain, Italy — are generally Roman Catholic. Christians in the eastern half of Southern Europe — e.g., Greece, Serbia and North Macedonia — are generally Eastern Orthodox. Islam is widely practiced in Albania, Bosnia, Kosovo and Turkey and Northern Cyprus. Muslims are a significant minority in several countries of Southern Europe- e.g., Greece, Italy, Spain.
Judaism was practiced widely throughout the European continent within the Roman Empire from the 2nd century.

Other classifications

CIA World Factbook

In the CIA World Factbook, the description of each country includes information about "Location" under the heading "Geography", where the country is classified into a region. The following countries are included in their classification "Southern Europe":
Greece
Holy See (Vatican City)
Italy
Malta
San Marino

In addition, Andorra, Gibraltar, Portugal and Spain are classified as "Southwestern Europe", while Albania, Bosnia and Herzegovina, Bulgaria, Croatia, Montenegro, North Macedonia, Romania, Serbia and Turkey (the part west of the Bosporus) are described as located in "Southeastern Europe".

EuroVoc

EuroVoc is a multilingual thesaurus maintained by the Publications Office of the European Union, giving definitions of terms for official use. In the definition of "Southern Europe", the following countries are included:
Cyprus
Greece
Holy See
Italy
Malta
Portugal
San Marino
Spain
Turkey

UN geoscheme classification

The United Nations geoscheme is a system devised by the United Nations Statistics Division (UNSD) which divides the countries of the world into regional and subregional groups, based on the M49 coding classification. The partition is for statistical convenience and does not imply any assumption regarding political or other affiliation of countries or territories.

In the UN geoscheme, the following countries are classified as Southern Europe:

 Albania
 Andorra
 Bosnia and Herzegovina
 Croatia
 Greece
 Holy See
 Italy
 Malta
 Montenegro
 North Macedonia
 Portugal
 San Marino
 Serbia
 Slovenia
 Spain

as well as the dependent territory:

 Gibraltar

European Travel Commission classification
European Travel Commission divides the European region on the basis of Tourism Decision Metrics (TDM) model.
Countries which belong to the Southern/Mediterranean Europe in this classification are:

Albania, Bosnia and Herzegovina, Croatia, East Thrace (Turkey), Greece, Italy, Malta, Montenegro, North Macedonia, Portugal, Serbia, Slovenia, and Spain.

See also

 Central and Eastern Europe
 Central Europe
 Eastern Europe
 EU Med Group
 EuroVoc#Southern Europe
 Mediterranean Basin
 Northern Europe
 Northwestern Europe
 Southeast Europe
 Western Europe

Notes

References

 
Regions of Europe